Slam Dance may refer to:

Slam Dance (film), a 1987 film
Slam Dance (TV series), a 2017 Thai television series
Slamdancing, also known as Moshing